Dactyloscopus insulatus is a species of sand stargazer from the Eastern Pacific Ocean. The species is endemic to the Revillagigedo Islands, such as San Benedicto Island, Socorro Island and Clarion Island.

References

insulatus
Taxa named by Charles Eric Dawson
Fish described in 1975